The Applebay GA-II Chiricahua is an American high-wing, single-seat, FAI Standard Class glider that was designed and constructed by George Applebay, first flying in 1970.

Design and development
Applebay started the Chiricahua as a standard class sailplane in 1959, but the aircraft was not completed for 11 years, first flying in 1970. It was named for the Chiricahua people, a group of Apache Native Americans.

The aircraft is made from wood and covered in a combination of plywood and doped Ceconite. Its  span wing employs a Göttingen 549 airfoil and features Schempp-Hirth style top surface airbrakes. As originally specified for the standard class, the landing gear was a fixed monowheel.

Only one example was built.

Operational history
On 7 July 1974 at New River, Arizona the prototype, N9413, was involved in an accident and substantially damaged. The aircraft was on a soaring flight, ran out of lift, made an attempted landing on a road in a  crosswind and struck a tree. The 24-year-old pilot, who had 32 hours of flying time total, including 11 hours on type, was not injured. The aircraft has since been re-registered as N53MB.

Specifications (GA-II)

See also

References

External links
Gŏttingen 549 airfoil

1970s United States sailplanes
Homebuilt aircraft
GA-II
Aircraft first flown in 1970